The Demolishers, published in 1987, is a novel in the long-running secret agent series Matt Helm by Donald Hamilton.

Plot summary
After Matt Helm's son is killed by a terrorist bomb, Helm goes on a mission of revenge against those responsible.

External links
Synopsis and summary

1987 American novels
Matt Helm novels